"When It Comes to You" is a song written by Mark Knopfler, and recorded by British rock music band Dire Straits for their 1991 album On Every Street. It was later covered by American country music artist John Anderson (with Knopfler on guitar) and released in April 1992 as the third single from his album Seminole Wind. It peaked at number 3 on the United States Billboard Hot Country Singles & Tracks chart and number 2 on the Canadian RPM Country Tracks chart.

The song was covered by Sturgill Simpson on the 2022 John Anderson tribute album Something Borrowed, Something New.

Content
The song is about a faltering marriage told from the point of view of the husband, who feels that his wife gives him a hard time in regards to everything he does and is wishing the relationship ends, rather than continue his feelings of despair.

Music video
The music video of Anderson's version was directed by Steve Boyle.

Chart positions

Year-end charts

References

John Anderson (musician) songs
1992 singles
Songs written by Mark Knopfler
Song recordings produced by James Stroud
Dire Straits songs
BNA Records singles
Song recordings produced by Mark Knopfler
1991 songs